Tuenjai Deetes (born 8 April 1952), formerly Tuenjai Kunjara na Ayudhya, (Thailand) received the Global 500 Roll of Honour in 1992, and  was awarded the Goldman Environmental Prize in 1994. Deetes has worked with Thai hill tribes since the early-1970s. She co-founded the Hill Area Development Foundation in 1986. She is a former commissioner of the Human Rights Commission until she resigned that post in July 2019.

References

Tuenjai Deetes
Tuenjai Deetes
Living people
1952 births
Goldman Environmental Prize awardees